De Beaufort's flathead (Cymbacephalus beauforti), also known as the crocodilefish or giant flathead, is a species of marine ray-finned fish belonging to the family Platycephalidae, the flatheads. It is found in the Western Pacific Ocean.

Taxonomy
De Beaufort's flathead was first formally described in 1973 as Platycephalus beauforti with its type locality given as off Urukthapel Island in the Palau Islands. The Specific name honours the Dutch ichthyologist Lieven Ferdinand de Beaufort of the University of Amsterdam, who made many notable contributions to ichthyology and who at the age of 88 wrote to Knapp encouraging him to revise the family Platycephalidae.

Description 
De Beaufort's flathead is a medium-sized fish which grows up to 50 cm (19.7 in), but the average size mostly observed is 35 cm (13.8 in).
The body is elongated and the head is particular because of its flat appearance like a duck bill.
They have lappets at the rear of their globulous eyes, which help to break up the outline of the black iris and improve their camouflage.
Juveniles begin black with few white spots and a white line behind the head. 
The adults have a body coloration which can vary in intensity according to the surrounding. The body is covered with a pattern like a mosaic of beige to brown spots or even greenish to grey separated by an interlacing of blue lines which ideally camouflaged them with their habitat.

Distribution and habitat
De Beaufort's flathead has a wide distribution extending from the Mentawai Islands in the far east of the Indian Ocean off Sumatra and including the Philippines, Borneo, Maluku Islands, Papua New Guinea, New Caledonia, Palau and from Yap Island to Ishigaki Island.

De Beaufort's flathead is found shallow water in areas of sand or coral rubble, near seagrasses or mangroves.

Biology
De Beaufort's flatheads are demersal ambush predators which feed mainly on smaller fish and crustaceans. The breeding biology of this species is little known but it is thought that the minimum population doubles at intervals between 4.5 and 14 years.

Eye lappet

References

External links
 MarineBio.org entry for Cymbacephalus beauforti (crocodilefish)
 Crocodilefish entry at Australian museum fish site
 Photos of several species of Crocodilefishes
 Marinespecies.org
 

Platycephalidae
Fish described in 1973